Al otro lado del muro is a Spanish-language telenovela produced by Telemundo Global Studios and Argos Comunicación that premiered on Telemundo on 21 February 2018, and concluded on 11 June 2018. The series revolves around two women, one of humble origin and the other a prominent figure, who cross from Mexico to the United States to remake their lives.

Plot 
The story follows the lives of two women, one of humble origin and the other a prominent figure, who cross the border from Mexico to the United States for different reasons: one chasing a dream and the other fleeing a nightmare. In this contemporary series, which reflects the reality of many emigrants, both women will have to do the impossible to move their children forward and survive, leaving behind everything they knew until then.

Cast

Main characters 
 Marjorie de Sousa as Sofía Villavicencio, is an ex beauty queen, married to Governor Ernesto Martínez.
 Litzy as Eliza Romero, she is a professional baker, married to Max Sullivan.
 Gabriel Porras as Ernesto Martínez, he is the governor of one of the states of Mexico.
 Adriana Barraza as Carmen Rosales de Romero, she is Eliza's mother. She is a patriotic woman who loves her country and her culture.

Recurring characters 
 Uriel del Toro as Andrés Suárez, a generous and supportive man. Andrés arrived in the United States with his wife, María, escaping the violence of the drug world.
 Guillermo Iván as Joel Benítez, he is an Interpol police officer, Joel is involved in a covert operation to deactivate the international traffic networks of women and children for sexual exploitation.
 Gabriela Vergara as Paula Duarte, is the private secretary and lover of Ernesto. She is a cold and ambitious woman who is responsible for designating political and media strategies to support Ernesto's political career.
 Khotan Fernández as Max Sullivan, for many years he has led a double life, married to Eliza in Mexico and Jennifer in the United States. He is not a bad guy and loves both families with all his heart. Things get complicated when he decides to divorce Jennifer and bring Eliza and her two children to live in the United States.
 Daniela Bascopé as Jennifer Suárez, her parents are from Latin America, but she was born and raised in the United States. Jennifer discovers Max's deception before anyone else and when she learns of her son's illness, she presses Max to stay with them and break any ties with his other family.
 Ana María Estupiñán as Karina Sullivan, she is the daughter of Max and Eliza, sister of Rodrigo and twin of Tomás. From her childhood, Karina was very interested in learning and in her studies. Ten years later, she becomes a beautiful and bright young girl, totally adapted to the customs and way of life of the Americans.
 Sofía Osorio as Child Karina Sullivan
 Mauricio Novoa as Tomas Sullivan
 Samuel Sadovnik as Child Tomas Sullivan
 Daniela Wong as Alondra Martínez
 Regina Orquín as Child Alondra Martínez
 Jonathan Freudman as Julián Martínez
 Emmanuel Pérez/Luis Antonio as Child Julián Martínez 
 Eduardo Trucco as Patrick O'Hara

Production 
The series was confirmed during Telemundo's upfront for the 2017-2018 television season. The production concluded on February 8, 2018.

Casting 
In Octobre 2017, it was announced Marjorie de Sousa had signed with Telemundo to be one of the main protagonists in the series. This would be the first appearance of Marjorie de Sousa with Telemundo, after acting for Venevisión and having formed part of the company Televisa for several years. On October 16, 2017, Litzy was confirmed as part of the main cast after three years in Señora Acero. The next day Gabriel Porras was confirmed as the protagonist. According to the People en Español magazine, the telenovela will star 6 actors of whom three are already known and who would be debuting as protagonists: Uriel del Toro, Guillermo Iván and Adriana Barraza who have previously acted in productions for Telemundo.

Promotion 
The first trailer of the series was shown on January 2, 2018.

Ratings 
 
}}

Episodes

Awards and nominations

References

External links 
 

American telenovelas
2018 telenovelas
Telemundo telenovelas
Spanish-language American telenovelas
2018 American television series debuts
Mexican telenovelas
2018 Mexican television series debuts
2018 American television series endings
2018 Mexican television series endings